Charles Nisard (10 January 1808 – 16 July 1890) was a French writer and critic, and member of the Institut. He was born in Châtillon-sur-Seine, and was brother of the writer Désiré Nisard (see family memorial online).

References

1808 births
1890 deaths

Members of the Académie des Inscriptions et Belles-Lettres
French male writers